Henry Harben may refer to:

 Henry Eric Southey Harben (1900–1971), English cricketer
 Sir Henry Harben (insurer) (1823–1911), British pioneer of industrial life assurance
 Henry Andrade Harben (1849–1910), barrister, insurance company director, politician, and historian of London
 Henry Devenish Harben (1874–1967), British barrister and politician